The 2011 FIVB Volleyball Men's Junior World Championship was held in Rio de Janeiro and Niterói, Brazil from 1 to 10 August 2011.

Pools composition

Venues
 Ginásio do Maracanãzinho, Rio de Janeiro, Brazil – Pool A, C, E, F, 5th–8th places and Final four
 Ginásio Caio Martins, Niterói, Brazil – Pool B, D, G, H, 13th–16th places and 9th–12th places

Pool standing procedure
 Match points
 Number of matches won
 Sets ratio
 Points ratio
 Result of the last match between the tied teams

Match won 3–0 or 3–1: 3 match points for the winner, 0 match points for the loser
Match won 3–2: 2 match points for the winner, 1 match point for the loser

First round
All times are Brasília Time (UTC−03:00).

Pool A

|}

|}

Pool B

|}

|}

Pool C

|}

|}

Pool D

|}

|}

Second round
All times are Brasília Time (UTC−03:00).

Pool E

|}

|}

Pool F

|}

|}

Pool G

|}

|}

Pool H

|}

|}

Final round
All times are Brasília Time (UTC−03:00).

13th–16th places

13th–16th semifinals

|}

15th place match

|}

13th place match

|}

9th–12th places

9th–12th semifinals

|}

11th place match

|}

9th place match

|}

5th–8th places

5th–8th semifinals

|}

7th place match

|}

5th place match

|}

Final four

Semifinals

|}

3rd place match

|}

Final

|}

Final standing

Awards

Most Valuable Player

Best Scorer

Best Spiker

Best Blocker

Best Server

Best Digger

Best Setter

Best Receiver

Best Libero

External links
Official website

2011 in volleyball
2011 in Brazilian sport
International volleyball competitions hosted by Brazil
FIVB Volleyball Men's U21 World Championship